Pope Adrian or Pope Hadrian may refer to:

Pope Adrian I (772–795)
Pope Adrian II (867–872)
Pope Adrian III (884–885)
Pope Adrian IV (1154–1159)
Pope Adrian V (1276)
Pope Adrian VI (1522–1523)

Fiction:
 Hadrian the Seventh, novel and play featuring a fictional English Pope Hadrian VII
Music:
 Pope Adrian 37th Psychristiatric, concept album by Rudimentary Peni

Adrian